This is a list of place names originally used in England and then later applied to other places throughout the world via English settlers and explorers.

Argentina
Hurlingham
Londres (Spanish for London)
Ranelagh

Australia
See English place names in Australia

Barbados
See English place names in Barbados

Bolivia

Manchester

Bermuda

Somerset
Somerset Island

Canada

See English place names in Canada

Chile

Punta Dúngeness
Wellington Island

Costa Rica

Liverpool

Hong Kong

Kennedy Town
Stanley
Prince Edward
Cape Collinson
Fortress Hill
Victoria Peak

India
Dalhousie, Himachal Pradesh (after Earl (later Marquess) of Dalhousie, Governor-General of India (1848-1856))
McLeod Ganj, Himachal Pradesh (after Sir Donald Friell McLeod, KCSI CB, Lieutenant Governor of the Punjab (1865-1870))
Forsythganj, Himachal Pradesh (after TD Forsythe, Esq, Civil Service, Asst Commissioner Simla District (1850))
Wellington, Tamil Nadu (after Arthur Wellesley, 1st Duke of Wellington)
Forbesganj, Bihar (after Alexander John Forbes British District Collector and Municipal Commissioner of East India Company)
Canning, West Bengal (after Lord Canning, Governor-General of India (1856-1858), and Governor-General & Viceroy (1858-1862))
Landsdowne, Uttarakhand (after Lord Landsdowne, Viceroy and Governor-General of India (1888-1894))

Places in Andaman & Nicobar Islands
Port Blair (after Archibald Blair, Esq, Captain in the Maritime Establishment of the East India Company at Bombay)
Ritchie's Archipelago (after John Ritchie, 18th-century British marine surveyor)
Napier Bay Island Group (likely after Field Marshal Robert Cornelis Napier, C-in-C India (1870 – 1876))
Henry Lawrence Island (after Brigadier-General Sir Henry Montgomery Lawrence KCB, Chief Commissioner Oudh) 
John Lawrence Island (after Sir John Laird Mair Lawrence, Viceroy and Governor-General of India (1864-1869)
Wilson Island (after Sir Archdale Wilson, Commandant Bengal Artillery Meerut, lead the action in Delhi and Lucknow, 1857)
Outram Island (after Lieutenant General Sir James Outram, capture of Lucknow, 1857)
Peel Island (after Captain Sir William Peel, Victoria Cross, wounded in the Relief of Lucknow)
James Island
Kyd Island
Smith Island
Pocock Island
Montgomery Island
Patric Island
Clyde Island
Elizabeth Bay
Campbell Bay
Macpherson's Strait
Mount Harriet National Park (after Harriet Tytler, wife of Capt Robert Tytler of the 38th Native Infantry (1857), Supdt of Cellular Jail (1862). To be renamed "Mount Manipur")
Stewart Island
Stewartgunj
Anderson Island
Bennett Island (after Capt Bennett, Marine)
Colebrook Island

Places in cities
Churchgate, in Mumbai
Whitefield, in Bengaluru
Hastings, in Kolkata
Renamed places
Daltongunj, Jharkhand (renamed Medininagar, 2004)
Ross Island (renamed Netaji Subhas Chandra Bose Island, Dec 2018)
Neill Island (renamed Shaheed Dweep,Dec 2018)
Havelock Island (renamed Swaraj Dweep, Dec 2018)
Renamed places in cities
Connaught Place (renamed Rajiv Chowk 1995),

Israel
 Airport City

Jamaica

Kingston
Manchester
Middlesex
Surrey
Cornwall

Montserrat

Plymouth

Northern Ireland

Chichester Park
Sydenham
Windsor
Woodstock

Pakistan

Abbottabad
Jacobabad
Jamesabad
Lawrencepur
Warburton

Serbia

Little London

South Africa

Arlington
Bedford
Boston
Bramley
Derby
Epsom Downs
Everton
Kensington
Kenton-on-Sea
Lindley, Free State
Lindley, Gauteng
Malmesbury 
Margate
New Brighton
Newcastle
Pennington
Richmond
Sandhurst
Somerset East
Somerset West
Sydenham
Worcester
York
Wellington

Sri Lanka
See Place names in Sri Lanka with an English name

 Alton
 Brampton
 Bray
 Devon Falls
 Harrow
 Hatton
 Hythe
 Kenilworth
 Marlborough
 Norton Bridge
 Norwood
 Preston

Trinidad and Tobago

Plymouth

United States

See List of locations in the United States with an English name